The Facts may refer to:
 The Facts: A Novelist's Autobiography, a novel by Philip Roth
 The Facts (Seattle), a weekly African-American newspaper based in Seattle, Washington's Central District, founded in 1961
 The Facts, a newspaper based in Clute, Texas
 Brazosport Facts
 The Facts, the 114th segment on the Strong Bad Email Series of Homestar Runner.